Wilderness Song (foaled 1988 in Ontario) is a retired Canadian Champion Thoroughbred racehorse and a Hall of Fame inductee. Out of the mare Nalee's Rhythm, she was sired by 1984 Breeders' Cup Classic winner Wild Again.

Bred and raced by Sam-Son Farm and trained by Jim Day, Wilderness Song lived under the shadow of her stablemate and fellow Hall of Fame filly Dance Smartly, to whom she finished second in the 1991 Canadian Oaks and the Queen's Plate. Her second-place finish at the Queen's Plate was also historic because of her passenger. Francine Villeneuve became both the first female jockey to finish "in the money" in a Canadian Triple Crown race and the first Canadian woman to ride in Canada's oldest race.

Wilderness Song won eight of her eighteen starts in Canada and made nineteen starts in the United States, where her seven wins included the Grade 1 Spinster Stakes at Keeneland Race Course. In 1992, Wilderness Song was voted the Sovereign Award for Champion Older Female Horse. She was retired to broodmare duty following the 1993 season.

In 2008, she was honored with induction into the Canadian Horse Racing Hall of Fame.

References
 Wilderness Song's pedigree and partial racing stats
 Wilderness Song at the Canadian Horse Racing Hall of Fame

1988 racehorse births
Racehorses bred in Ontario
Racehorses trained in Canada
Racehorses trained in the United States
Sovereign Award winners
Canadian Horse Racing Hall of Fame inductees
Thoroughbred family 10-c